Foreign relations between Argentina and Peru, have existed for over a century. Both countries established diplomatic relations on July 10, 1822.  Both nations are members of the Community of Latin American and Caribbean States, Group of 77, Organization of American States, Organization of Ibero-American States and the United Nations.

Historical relations

Cenepa War controversy

In 1995, Peru was involved in the Cenepa War, a brief thirty-three-day war with Ecuador over the Cenepa River sector of the Cordillera del Condor territory in the western Amazon basin. Argentina, Chile, Brazil, and the United States, as the guarantors of the 1942 Rio Protocol that had put an end to the Ecuadorian–Peruvian War earlier that century, worked with the governments of Peru and Ecuador to find a return to the status quo and end their border disputes once and for all. On 2005, General Víctor Manuel Bayas, former Chief of Staff of the Ecuadorian Armed Forces during the Cenepa War, made a series of declarations in regards to the armed conflict between Peru and Ecuador. On March 21, 2005, General Bayas was asked by the Ecuadorian newspaper El Comercio if Chile had sold armaments to Ecuador during the Cenepa War, to which he replied: “Yes, it was a contract with the militaries during the conflict." Furthermore, General Bayas revealed that Argentina and Russia had also sold weaponry to Ecuador during the conflict.

Argentina admitted to the illegal sale of armament by revealing the existence of three secret decrees signed by President Carlos Menem between the years of 1991 and 1995. The controversy regarding the decrees came about when the weapons sold did not go to Panama, Bolivia, and Venezuela as had been accorded, but instead the weapons ended up in Croatia and Ecuador at times when both of these nations were involved in wars and prohibited from receiving international military aid. The sale Argentina gave to Ecuador included 6.500 tons of rifles, cannons, anti-tank rockets, and ammunition. Menem was taken to court for his alleged association with these illegal acts in 2001, but was acquitted by Argentina's Supreme Court; however, in October 2008 the case was re-opened, but Menem can currently avoid being detained by Argentine authorities until 2010 when his position as senator of La Rioja is finished. Menem claims to have had no association with the illegal weapons trade, and further adds that this is a political persecusion made by Argentine president Cristina Fernández and, her husband and also former Argentine president, Néstor Kirchner.

Resident diplomatic missions
 Argentina has an embassy in Lima.  
 Peru has an embassy in Buenos Aires and consulates-generals in Córdoba, La Plata and Mendoza.

See also
 List of ambassadors of Peru to Argentina

References

External links

  Argentine Ministry of Foreign Relations: list of bilateral treaties with Peru (in Spanish only)
  Peruvian Ministry of Foreign Relations about relations with Argentina (in Spanish only)
  Peruvian embassy in Buenos Aires (in Spanish only)
  Peruvian general consulate in La Plata (in Spanish only)

 
Peru 
Bilateral relations of Peru